WestShore Plaza is one of two enclosed shopping malls located in the Westshore business district of Tampa, Florida, developed by Albert L. Manley of Boston, MA. WestShore Plaza was opened in 1967 and was touted as Tampa's first shopping center that was fully air-conditioned. WestShore houses many specialty shops including Francesca's Collection, LOFT, New Balance, H&M, Old Navy, Sunglass Hut, and more. The property is owned and managed by Washington Prime Group.

The mall's anchors are  JCPenney, flagship Macy's and Dick's Sporting Goods stores, and an AMC movie theater, with one vacant anchor last occupied by Sears. Restaurants include P.F. Chang's China Bistro, Grimaldi's Pizzeria, Irish 31, the Bay Area's only Maggiano's Little Italy, Seasons 52, and Mitchell's Fish Market Restaurant and there is also a kids play area near JCPenney. A nursing room can be found in the women's restroom and baby changing stations in all restrooms.

History
Westshore Plaza opened on September 28, 1967, as the Tampa Bay area's first enclosed shopping mall.

The mall's first anchor was Maas Brothers, which actually opened a year before the rest of the mall on October 28, 1966, featuring the Suncoast Room Restaurant on the third floor. The store, which was built to complement their flagship store in downtown Tampa, became their second to be located in a shopping mall a year later (their first was at the Edison Mall in Fort Myers), and they later went on to open more mall stores on Florida's Gulf Coast.

JCPenney opened on September 7, 1967, as a second anchor and only original anchor remaining today.  It opened along with the first mall segment between it and Maas Brothers, which was dedicated a month later. Like Edison Mall, the center most notably included a Woolworth's five-and-dime store upon its opening, but also featured Walgreens and a Pantry Pride grocery store.

The mall was expanded for the first time with a northeast wing in 1974 along with the north parking garage and a third anchor, Robinson's, which sold its Florida stores to Maison Blanche in 1987, which in turn then sold its store and six others on the West Coast of Florida to Dillard's in 1991. Dillard’s then moved to the upscale International Plaza and Bay Street a mile away. Sears took over the site after moving from Tampa Bay Center in 2002, which closed as a result. Sears announced on December 28 that the store would be among 80 stores to shutter nationwide in March 2019.

Also in 1991, Maas Brothers was merged with Miami-based Burdines, which in turn was renamed Burdine's-Macy's in 2003, dropping the Burdine's name two years later.

WestShore Plaza was acquired by the Grosvenor Group in 1990, which led to a large renovation to the mall. The mall interior was remodeled with a more Spanish-Mediterranean style interior with a three-story bell tower built over the center court.

Saks Fifth Avenue opened on the west end of the mall along with a third expansion on November 12, 1998, but closed in 2013 and became a flagship Dick's Sporting Goods in 2014. In March 2014 the Palm restaurant closed after more than a dozen years in business at the WestShore Plaza. The fourth and most recent expansion in 2000 involved relocating the food court east into the former Pantry Pride building and a new west wing of mall space with a 14-screen AMC Theatres on the second level.

On June 4, 2020, JCPenney announced that it would be closing as part of a plan to close 154 stores nationwide. However, the store was removed from the list on June 24, 2020 along with 17 other stores so it would be remaining open for now.

Programs
Offered by FIT4MOM, Stroller Strides is a fitness program, held at WestShore Plaza and surrounding areas, that mothers can do with their children. The program includes power walking and running and intervals of strength and body toning exercises using the stroller and the environment. It is taught by trained fitness instructors who put songs and activities into the routine to engage the children, while moms are led through a series of exercises. It is the only program that allows moms to work out with their babies.

Anchors

Current
AMC WestShore 14 (opened in 2000 as part of fourth mall expansion on an upper level)
Dick's Sporting Goods (opened in 2014 in former Saks Fifth Avenue location)
JCPenney (original anchor to the mall)
Macy's (former Maas Brothers and Burdines location)

Former
Maas Brothers (became Burdines in 1991)
Burdines (became Macy's in 2005)
Robinson's (became Maison Blanche in 1987)
Maison Blanche (became Dillard's in 1991)
Dillard's (closed in 2001 and reopened as Sears in 2002)
Sears (former Robinson's, Maison Blanche, and Dillard's location, closed March 2019)
Saks Fifth Avenue (closed in 2013 and gutted; redone as Dick's Sporting Goods in 2014)

References

External links
Westshore Plaza Official Website
Family-Friendly Tampa Bay

Buildings and structures in Tampa, Florida
Shopping malls in Florida
Washington Prime Group
Shopping malls established in 1967
Tourist attractions in Tampa, Florida
1967 establishments in Florida